"Foxy, Foxy" is a non-LP single released by Mott the Hoople in 1974. It reached number 33 on the UK Singles Chart, their penultimate entry in that listing.

References

Mott the Hoople songs
1974 singles
Songs written by Ian Hunter (singer)
1974 songs
CBS Records singles